V Shanmuganathan (born 21 November 1949) was the Governor of the Indian state of Meghalaya, in office from 2015 to 26 January 2017. A veteran from Tamil Nadu, he also held an additional charge as Governor of Arunachal Pradesh from September 2016 till his resignation on 26 January 2017.

Early life and career
A post-graduate and an MPhil in Political Science, V Shanmuganathan received the Madras University's prestigious Gold Medal from its well-known Vice Chancellor T P Meenakshi Sundarnar in 1970. Born on 21 November 1949, he hails from Thanjavur in Tamil Nadu.

Governorships
Shanmuganathan succeeded Keshari Nath Tripathi as Governor of Meghalaya on 12 May 2015. On 30 September 2015 he was additionally sworn in as the 17th Governor of Manipur after the death in office of Syed Ahmed.

References

External links
Meggovernor.gov.in

|-

|-

1949 births
Living people
Governors of Meghalaya
Governors of Manipur
People from Tamil Nadu
University of Madras alumni